Filiz Koç (born 6 October 1986), aka Filiz Heilmann or Filiz Heilmann Koç, is a Turkish-German women's football midfielder, currently playing in the Turkish Women's First League for 1207 Antalya Muratpaşa Belediye Spor with jersey number 13. She is a member of the Turkey women's team. She also has a media career as model, beauty pageant contestant, actress and sideline reporter.

Early life
Filiz Koç was born to a Turkish father and a German mother in Ankara, Turkey on 6 October 1986. Her father, Savaş Koç, played football for the Turkish Süper Lig-team Galatasaray SK between 1986 and 1990.

Her national-footballer father met his later wife during a football match in Munich. The couple married in Turkey, but moved to Germany when Filiz was three years old.  where her father continued his football career playing for the Bundesliga team Hannover 96. At age 16, she was naturalized in Germany, holding now dual citizenship.

Filiz Koç completed her education in a private school to become an instructor for sports and fitness.

In her early years, she preferred to be called after her mother's family name "Heilmann" hoping so to have more opportunities. Later on, however, she began using her father's surname "Koç".

Sports career
Inspired by her father's sports profession, Filiz Koç developed a passion for football in her childhood at home. Already at age ten, she decided to become a footballer.

Club
She began football playing in 1997 at age eleven, entering the German club TSV Havelse based near Hanover. The next season, she moved to Mellendorfer TV, and enjoyed in 2008 her team's promotion to the Group North of 2nd Women's Bundesliga. In 2009, she transferred to another 2nd-League-team FFC Oldesloe 2000, where she briefly played. In the 2011–12 season, she rejoined her first team TSV Havelse in the Women's Regional League North. The next season, she resigned from professional football, and was loaned out to SC Wedemark, which competed in the Landesliga (State League) until the team fell apart at the end of the 2014–15 season. She was taken over by TSV Limmer, and  played in the Regionalliga one season.

In September 2015, she moved in a loan-out contract to the Turkish club 1207 Antalya Muratpaşa Belediye Spor, which had finished the 2014–15 season in the Turkish Women's Second League as champion, and was so promoted to the Women"s First League. The release approval of her former club TSV Limmer for her to play in Turkey was set to run out at the end of the 2015–16 season, end of March 2016.

At age 20, she suffered a nasal fracture during a futsal game, and had to undergo a corrective surgery later on.

International
In 2002 at age 16, Filiz Koç was called up to the Turkey girls' under-17 team. She played three games before she had to stay away from the pitch due to a severe muscle injury.

In 2009, she appeared in two matches of the Turkey women's team. She was called up again in 2015, and played in the friendly match against Albania on 19 August 2015. Koç took part at the UEFA Women's Euro 2017 qualifying Group 5 game against Hungary on 21 October the same year.

Career statistics
–

In media
Filiz Koç  acts as a model, and appears in advertisings.

At age 18, she participated at the local beauty pageant "Miss Hannover" upon her mother's request, and placed second.

Representing Turkey, she became runner-up "Miss EM" (EM is the German language abbreviation for European Championship) among 16 contestants ranking after Domenica Huzvarova from the Czech Republic at a beauty pageant held at Europa-Park, Germany on the occasion of the UEFA Euro 2008.

Filiz Koç took part in 2010 at the game show Die perfekte Minute broadcast by Sat.1, and won a money prize of 75,000 by  exhibiting her freestyle football art.

In June 2011, Filiz Koç performed the role of "Fadime Gülüc", a murdered fictional German woman footballer of Turkish descent in the  episode Im Abseits (In Offside) of police procedural television series Tatort aired by the ARD channel.

She worked as a sideline reporter of Sky Deutschland for the 2. Bundesliga matches beginning with the 2011–12 football season.

Filiz Koç appeared in the German reality shows Die Model WG and Das Model und der Freak aired by the German commercial TV channel ProSieben.

References

External links
 
 
 Personal website

Living people
1986 births
Footballers from Ankara
Turkish people of German descent
German women's footballers
Turkish women's footballers
Women's association football midfielders
German female models
German actresses
German beauty pageant winners
Turkish beauty pageant winners
Women sports announcers
1207 Antalya Spor players
Turkey women's international footballers